Mriganko Mahato is a member of the All India Trinamool Congress and has won the 2014 Indian general elections from the Purulia (Lok Sabha constituency).

An Ophthalmologist by profession he was associated with Purulia District Hospital. He was a student Of Ramkrishna Mission Schools at Purulia and Narendrapur.

References

Living people
India MPs 2014–2019
Lok Sabha members from West Bengal
People from Purulia district
1963 births